Richard Hope (1890 – 1969) was a Scottish footballer who played for Stoke.

Career
Hope was born in Glasgow and began his career with Glasgow St Peter's. He joined Stoke in 1914 and played twice for the "Potters" in 1914–15 before returning to Scottish football with Port Glasgow.

Career statistics

References

Scottish footballers
Stoke City F.C. players
1890 births
1969 deaths
Association football forwards